Priyadarshini is a 1978 Indian Malayalam-language film, directed by Peruvaaram Chandrasekaran. The film stars T. R. Omana, Raghavan, Bahadoor and Jayasudha. The film's score was composed by M. K. Arjunan.

Cast
T. R. Omana 
Raghavan 
Bahadoor 
Jayasudha 
Kottarakkara Sreedharan Nair 
M. G. Soman

Soundtrack
The music was composed by M. K. Arjunan with lyrics by Vayalar Ramavarma.

References

External links
 

1978 films
1970s Malayalam-language films